Conny Karlsson may refer to:

Conny Karlsson (footballer) (born 1953), Swedish football manager and former player
Conny Karlsson (shot putter) (born 1975), Finnish shot putter